The 2021 LSU Tigers baseball team will represent Louisiana State University in the 2021 NCAA Division I baseball season. The Tigers will play their home games at Alex Box Stadium.

Previous season
The Tigers started the season 12–5, however the season was suspended and ultimately canceled due to the COVID-19 pandemic. The Tigers had not yet begun SEC play. As a result, two seniors–Matthew Beck and Aaron George–were given an extra year of eligibility. In the 2019 season, the Tigers won the Baton Rouge Regional in the 2019 NCAA Division I baseball tournament before losing the Baton Rouge Super Regional to Florida State.

Preseason

SEC Coaches poll
The SEC coaches poll was released on February 11, 2021 with the Tigers predicted to finish fourth in the Western Division.

Preseason All-SEC teams

First Team
Devin Fontenot – Pitcher

Second Team
Cade Beloso – Outfielder
Reference:

Personnel

Roster

Coaching staff

Schedule and results

Schedule Source:
*Rankings are based on the team's current ranking in the D1Baseball poll.

Conference matrix

Rankings

2021 MLB draft

References

LSU
LSU Tigers baseball seasons
LSU Tigers baseball
LSU